Gadhia is a village and former minor princely state on Saurashtra peninsula, in Gujarat, western India.

History 
The petty state in Sorath prant was ruled by Kathi Chieftains. 
In 1901 it comprised Gadhia and  a second village, with a population of 528, yielding 4,500 Rupees state revenue (1903-4, mostly from land), paying 295 Rupees tribute, to the Gaikwar Baroda State and Junagadh State.

References

External links and sources 
 Imperial Gazetteer, on dsal.uchicago.edu

Princely states of Gujarat
Kathi princely states
Subdivisions of British India
Villages in Amreli district